The 2007–08 Los Angeles Kings season was the 41st season (40th season of play) for the National Hockey League franchise. Their season began with the team playing a neutral site home-and-home series with the defending Stanley Cup champion Anaheim Ducks at the O2 Arena in London, England, the first time the NHL has held a regular season game in Europe.

Along with the switch to the Rbk Edge uniforms instituted league-wide for 2007–08, the Kings also changed their goal celebration horn at Staples Center from a foghorn to a train horn.

Regular season

The Kings struggled on the penalty kill, finishing 30th overall in penalty-kill percentage (77.99%).

Divisional standings

Conference standings

Schedule and results

September
Record: 1–1–0; Home: 1–0–0; Road: 0–1–0

*At O2 Arena in London, England

October
Record: 6–7–0; Home: 5–4–0; Road: 1–3–0

November
Record: 2–5–1; Home: 1–3–0; Road: 1–2–1

December
Record: 2–11–1; Home: 2–5–1; Road: 0–6–0

January
Record: 6–5–0; Home: 4–4–0; Road: 2–1–0

February
Record: 5–6–1; Home: 2–1–1; Road: 3–5–0

March
Record: 5–6–3 ; Home: 2–3–1; Road: 3–3–2

April
Record: 1–2–0; Home: 1–1–0; Road: 0–1–0

Playoffs
The Kings were officially eliminated from playoff contention in early March for the fifth consecutive season.  The franchise has not made the playoffs since the 2001–02 NHL season.

Player statistics

Skaters
Note: GP = Games played; G = Goals; A = Assists; Pts = Points; PIM = Penalty minutes

Goaltenders
Note: GP = Games played; Min = Minutes played; W = Wins; L = Losses; OT = Overtime/shootout losses; GA = Goals against; SO = Shutouts; SV% = Save percentage; GAA = Goals against average

Awards and records

Records

Milestones

Transactions
The Kings have been involved in the following transactions during the 2007–08 season:

Trades

Free agents

Draft picks
Los Angeles' picks at the 2007 NHL Entry Draft in Columbus, Ohio.  The Kings had the 4th overall selection.

Farm teams

Manchester Monarchs
The Manchester Monarchs are the Kings American Hockey League (AHL) affiliate in 2007–08.

Reading Royals
The Reading Royals are the Kings affiliate in the ECHL.

See also
2007–08 NHL season

References

Player stats: Los Angeles Kings player stats on espn.com
Game log: Los Angeles Kings game log on espn.com
Team standings: NHL standings on espn.com

2007-08
2007–08 NHL season by team
Los
LA Kings
LA Kings